Micheal Curtis Spurlock (born January 31, 1983) is an American football coach and former wide receiver who is the wide receivers coach for the Western Kentucky. He was signed by the Arizona Cardinals as an undrafted free agent in 2006. He played college football at Ole Miss.

Spurlock has also played for the San Diego Chargers, Tampa Bay Buccaneers, San Francisco 49ers, Jacksonville Jaguars, Dallas Cowboys, Detroit Lions, Chicago Bears, and Florida Tuskers.

Early years
At Gentry High School in Indianola, Mississippi, he passed for Class 5A state records of 3,348 yards and 35 touchdowns in 2000, also rushed for another 1,161 yards and scored 10 touchdowns, giving him 4,509 total yards and 45 touchdowns during senior campaign. He also currently holds the Mississippi High School State record for passing yards in a single game (581) and touchdowns in a single game (9). He earned three letters in football, four in baseball and three in basketball, playing as a shortstop-pitcher in baseball, was three-time selection as team's Most Valuable Player and Best Defensive Player. He was also the starting guard in basketball.

College career
While at Ole Miss, he played in all 11 games, starting eight, seven at quarterback, and the season finale at running back, as a senior in 2005. As quarterback, he passed for 1,709 yards on 142-of-267 completions with seven touchdowns and nine interceptions and rushed for two touchdowns. He appeared in seven-of-11 games in 2004 as a junior, connected on 30-of-70 passes for 341 yards, and rushed 27 times for 59 yards. He only played in two of 13 games as a sophomore in 2003 as he was behind Eli Manning on the depth chart and he completed seven-of-eight passes for 118 yards and two touchdowns. His only action of 2002 as a redshirt freshman came against the Arkansas State Indians. He redshirted in 2001.

Professional career

Arizona Cardinals
Spurlock signed with the Cardinals as an undrafted free agent rookie in 2006. Spurlock spent most of the year on the practice squad but was promoted to the roster on December 29, 2006 and in his first NFL game against the San Diego Chargers tied for the team lead with four receptions.

First stint with Buccaneers
On December 16, 2007, Spurlock became the first player in Tampa Bay Buccaneers franchise history to return a kickoff for a touchdown in a regular season game, taking a kick back 90 yards for a score in a game against the Atlanta Falcons. At the time, Tampa Bay had not returned a kickoff for a touchdown in their entire 32-year history when this was accomplished; it was the 1,865th kickoff the Buccaneers had ever received. He was cut by the team on August 31, 2008 but was quickly re-signed to their practice squad.

San Francisco 49ers
On January 21, 2009, Spurlock was signed to a future contract by the San Francisco 49ers.

After the 2009 preseason, Spurlock was officially signed to the team, due to first round draft pick Michael Crabtree holding out. He was waived by the team on November 3.

Second stint with Buccaneers
Spurlock re-signed with the Buccaneers on December 22, 2009. In his first game back with the Bucs, he returned a punt for a touchdown, leading to a 20-17 victory for Tampa Bay over the 13-1 New Orleans Saints.

On November 7, 2010, against the Atlanta Falcons, Spurlock returned a squib kick for a touchdown. It was the second kickoff return for a touchdown in his career.

San Diego Chargers
The San Diego Chargers signed Spurlock on April 4, 2012. Spurlock returned a 99-yard kick off return for a touchdown against the Oakland Raiders. 
The San Diego Chargers released Spurlock on October 3, 2012.

Jacksonville Jaguars
The Jacksonville Jaguars signed Spurlock on October 5, 2012.

Second stint with Chargers
Spurlock was claimed off waivers on November 28, 2012 after the Jaguars released him to make room for Jason Babin.

Detroit Lions
Spurlock signed with the Detroit Lions on June 4, 2013.

Dallas Cowboys
Spurlock signed with the Dallas Cowboys on December 18, 2013. While playing against the Washington Redskins in his first game with the Cowboys, Spurlock returned a punt for 62 yards to set up the team's first touchdown.

In order to make room for quarterback Jon Kitna, the Cowboys released Spurlock on December 25, 2013. He was re-signed by the Lions later that day.

Chicago Bears
Spurlock signed with the Chicago Bears on June 3, 2014. He was waived from the Chicago Bears on September 9, 2014.

References

External links
Tampa Bay Buccaneers bio

1983 births
Living people
People from Indianola, Mississippi
Players of American football from Mississippi
American football quarterbacks
American football running backs
American football wide receivers
American football return specialists
Ole Miss Rebels football players
Arizona Cardinals players
Tampa Bay Buccaneers players
San Francisco 49ers players
Florida Tuskers players
San Diego Chargers players
Jacksonville Jaguars players
Detroit Lions players
Dallas Cowboys players
Chicago Bears players
Green Bay Packers coaches